was a railway station on the Kashima Railway Line in Hokota, Ibaraki, Japan. Opened in 1956, it closed when the line was closed on 31 March 2007.

Lines
It was located between Tomoegawa and Hokota stations, and was a distance of 25.0 rail km from Ishioka Station.

Station layout
The unstaffed station consisted of one side platform serving a single track.

History
Sakado Station opened on 19 November 1956. It closed on 31 March 2007 when the entire line was closed.

Passenger statistics
In fiscal 2000, the station was used by an average of 68 passengers daily.

Surrounding area
 Hokota Park
 Hotpark Hokota

Adjacent stations

References

Railway stations in Japan opened in 1956
Railway stations in Ibaraki Prefecture
Kashima Railway Line
Railway stations closed in 2007